Viçidol is a village in the Kukës County, northern Albania. At the 2015 local government reform it became part of the municipality Tropojë.

Notable people
Sali Berisha  politician and former Prime Minister of Albania

References

Populated places in Tropojë
Villages in Kukës County